Zanatta is a surname. Notable people with the surname include:

Dario Zanatta (born 1997), Canadian footballer
Gustavo Zanatta (born 1951), Mexican politician
Néstor Zanatta (born 1973), Argentine footballer
Sergio Zanatta, Canadian footballer

See also 
 Zanata (disambiguation)